Arnold Edwin "Arnie" Kullman (October 9, 1927 – June 11, 1999) was a Canadian ice hockey centreman who played 13 National Hockey League (NHL) games with the Boston Bruins between 1948 and 1950 and 12 American Hockey League (AHL) seasons with Hershey Bears between 1948 and 1960. His jersey #9 is retired by the Bears.

Personal life
Kullman was born on October 9, 1927, in Winnipeg, Manitoba, Canada. Kullman's grandson Justin is the former equipment manager of the Hershey Bears. He was also related to the late Eddie Kullman of the New York Rangers.

Career
Kullman made his professional ice hockey career debut with the Boston Bruins American Hockey League (AHL) affiliate, the Hershey Bears, during the 1948–49 AHL season. In the following season, he was called up for a 14 game stint with the Boston Bruins of the National Hockey League, but was subsequently returned to Hershey on January 11, 1950. Kullman continued his dominance of the American Hockey League and recorded seven consecutive 20 goal seasons until 1956.  Although his game slid after the 1955–56 season, he remained one of the few active 200 goal scorers and played on the Bears' penalty kill. He had a career high season during the 1953–54 campaign in which he recorded 81 points; 40 goals and 41 assists. 

Throughout his 12 seasons with the Bears, Kullman dominated the Hershey Bears and set multiple records before officially retiring in April 1960. At the time of his retirement, Kullman ranked second in games played and goals, third in points and fourth in assists. Kullman died on June 11, 1999, in Hershey, Pennsylvania.

Career statistics

Regular season and playoffs

Awards and achievements
Calder Cup (AHL) Championships (1958 & 1959)
Honoured Member of the Manitoba Hockey Hall of Fame
AHL All-Stars (1955)

References

External links

1927 births
1999 deaths
Boston Bruins players
Boston Olympics players
Brandon Elks players
Canadian ice hockey centres
Hershey Bears players
Ice hockey people from Winnipeg
Winnipeg Rangers players